Port Washington is a village in Tuscarawas County, Ohio, United States. The population was 569 at the 2010 census.

History
Port Washington was originally called Salisbury, and under the latter name was laid out in 1827. A post office called Port Washington has been in operation since 1832.

Geography
Port Washington is located at  (40.327467, -81.520096), along the Tuscarawas River.

Demographics

2010 census
As of the census of 2010, there were 569 people, 209 households, and 164 families living in the village. The racial makeup of the village was 97.7% White, 0.2% Asian, 1.8% from other races, and 0.4% from two or more races. Hispanic or Latino of any race were 1.8% of the population.

There were 209 households, of which 38.8% had children under the age of 18 living with them, 60.8% were married couples living together, 12.9% had a female householder with no husband present, 4.8% had a male householder with no wife present, and 21.5% were non-families. 16.7% of all households were made up of individuals, and 7.6% had someone living alone who was 65 years of age or older. The average household size was 2.72 and the average family size was 2.99.

The median age in the village was 39.1 years. 26.4% of residents were under the age of 18; 7.2% were between the ages of 18 and 24; 24.6% were from 25 to 44; 25.8% were from 45 to 64; and 16% were 65 years of age or older. The gender makeup of the village was 48.7% male and 51.3% female.

2000 census
As of the census of 2000, there were 552 people, 204 households, and 161 families living in the village. The population density was 1,091.2 people per square mile (417.9/km). There were 213 housing units at an average density of 421.1 per square mile (161.3/km). The racial makeup of the village was 97.83% White, 0.18% African American, 0.54% from other races, and 1.45% from two or more races. Hispanic or Latino of any race were 1.27% of the population.

There were 204 households, out of which 35.3% had children under the age of 18 living with them, 67.6% were married couples living together, 9.3% had a female householder with no husband present, and 20.6% were non-families. 16.7% of all households were made up of individuals, and 6.4% had someone living alone who was 65 years of age or older. The average household size was 2.71 and the average family size was 3.02.

In the village, the population was spread out, with 25.2% under the age of 18, 8.5% from 18 to 24, 31.7% from 25 to 44, 24.3% from 45 to 64, and 10.3% who were 65 years of age or older. The median age was 37 years. For every 100 females there were 97.1 males. For every 100 females age 18 and over, there were 93.9 males.

The median income for a household in the village was $36,111, and the median income for a family was $37,344. Males had a median income of $28,750 versus $18,173 for females. The per capita income for the village was $13,674. About 2.3% of families and 6.1% of the population were below the poverty line, including 6.5% of those under age 18 and 10.8% of those age 65 or over.

Notable people
 Alexander Helwig Wyant - American landscape painter
 Bob Huggins - college basketball coach
John H. Lamneck - Ohio Supreme Court Judge
Arthur P. Lamneck - U.S. Congressman

References 

Villages in Tuscarawas County, Ohio
Villages in Ohio